Joseph Nathaniel (born 1 October 1993, in Lagos) is a Nigerian football player who currently plays as a midfielder for the Iraqi Premier League team Al-Hedood.

Honours

Al-Nasr
Sultan Qaboos Cup: 2017–18

Individual
Soccer Iraq Goal of the Season: 2020–21

References

External links
 Joseph Nathaniel at Soccerway.com
 Joseph Nathaniel at Playmakerstats.com

1993 births
Living people
Association football midfielders
Nigerian footballers
Nigeria international footballers
Sharks F.C. players
Shooting Stars S.C. players
Lobi Stars F.C. players
Al-Nasr SC (Salalah) players
Al-Nasr SC (Benghazi) players
Oman Professional League players
Expatriate footballers in Oman
Expatriate footballers in Libya
Expatriate footballers in Iraq
Nigerian expatriates in Oman
Nigerian expatriates in Libya
Nigerian expatriates in Iraq
Libyan Premier League players
Sportspeople from Lagos